Katarzyna Karpowicz (4 November 1985) is a Polish contemporary painter.

Biography
Karpowicz was born in Kraków to Anna Karpowicz-Westner (maiden name Wiejak) and Sławomir Karpowicz(1952-2001), both painters. 
Her father was a professor of art at Cracow Academy of Fine Arts.  Parents, together with their daughters Joanna and Katarzyna lived and painted in the studio on Piłsudzkiego Street previously owned by Olga Boznańska.
In 2005 she graduated from art high school Państwowe Liceum Sztuk Plastycznych and began her studies at National School of Fine Arts in Cracow.
Until 2008, she studied under Grzegorz Bednarski. She graduated with honors in 2010 under Leszek Misiak. Katarzyna Karpowicz’s works can be found in collections in Poland and abroad, as well as in the collection of the Museum of Contemporary Art in Gdansk.
She lived and painted in Budapest (2013-2015) and later in England (2015-2016) in Pangbourne.
She is a figurative painter. In 2019 she was awarded Anna Maria Siemieńska Grazella Foundation’s artistic scholarship for young artists. She gave several interviews discussing her artistic heritage and musical taste. In an interview in Magyar Nemzet a Hungarian art critic talks about influences of Budapest on Karpowicz's art.

Critical reception
Between 2017-2019 she placed in top three of young Polish painters in a prestigious competition Young artist compass. 
Her art received positive comments from several independent art critics.
Art critic Małgorzata Czyńska mentions  that her paintings combine childlike beauty and somewhat naïve trust, but are streaked with fear and the experience of the cruelty of fate. The same critic
writes that Katarzyna Karpowicz’s works are deeply universal and existential,
revolving around relationships, expectations, hope and fears. 
Samanta Belling indicates that Karpowicz's works prove that there are still young artists who live for art and are able to create an atmosphere that evokes past memories. She states that "Katarzyna Karpowicz seems to be out of this epoch, as if she were living beyond the time, just like her paintings. By deliberately simplifying the form of her work, she gives us room for impressions, guesses and personal interpretations."
Kama Wróbel opines that each new series of Karpowicz's work has deep meaning and provides a point of departure for multi-faceted consideration of the human condition.
Art historian Stanisław Tabisz writes about Karpowicz's fascinations with the circus in Budapest, solar eclipse observed with her father in their hometown of Szczebrzeszyn and youthful influences in her paintings.
He goes on to state that "Katarzyna Karpowicz's paintings express, in their sincere and straightforward message, the connection of each of us with the world, of experiencing everything in a unique and exceptional way."
Daniel Czepiński writes that one finds oneself in Karpowicz's studio surrendered by magical trees, doors and openings which all lead to new worlds.
Adam Szczuciński finds captivating charm of the unknown in her paintings. He also writes in his essay A physician's viewpoint
that Karpowicz's "powerful talent makes it truly impossible to
remain indifferent to her small-sized images" and he concludes that "they infect the memory and stay like afterimages on the retina after we close our eyes." 
Ewa Ogłoza in art journal artPaper writes that she is enchanted with Katarzyna Karpowicz's paintings and delighted with her life attitude and art "characterized by gratitude, kindness, humility, seriousness, mindfulness and tenderness towards the world, people and culture".  She states that Karpowicz loves to paint and looks for consolation and hope in art "by designing her own fears, hopes, dreams, she gives comfort to others".

Exhibitions, awards and distinctions

Solo exhibitions
 2019 · November, “Litte Big Life”, Platon Gallery, Wrocław
 2018 · December, “Blue Glass”, Art Gallery, Warsaw
 2018 · April, “The Teatre of the Everyday”, Raven Gallery, Kraków
 2017 · October, “Goodbye, Till Tomorrow”, Triada Gallery, Gdańsk
 2017 · April, “Human Stories”, Promocyjna Gallery, Warsaw
 2016 · April, “Genius Loci”, Artemis Gallery, Krakow
 2015 · October, “Harold and Ernest”, St. Bartholomew`s Church, Lower Basildon, UK
 2014 · November, “The life of the image”, Szép Műhely Gallery, Budapest, Hungary
 2014 · March, “On the road”, Platon Gallery, Wroclaw
 2013 · October, “Katarzyna Karpowicz – painting”, Klub Adwokatow, Krakow
 2013 · April, “Man and animal”, Tge Mazovia Region Centre of Culture and Arts – Elektor Gallery, Warsaw
 2012 · August, “Horizon”, OdDo Gallery, Gdynia, Poland
 2012 · January, “Between light and shadow”, The Cracow Museum of Pharmacy, Cracow, Poland
 2011 · December, “In my dreams”, Art Gallery, Warsaw, Poland
 2011 · May, “Transition”, BWA Gallery, Zamosc, Poland
 2011 · May, “Let’s go to sleep!”, The Night of Museums, Art Gallery, Warsaw, Poland
 2011 · January, “The meeting”, 2 Worlds Gallery, Krakow, Poland

Selected group exhibitions
 2019 · “Young Polish Painting”, National Museum in Gdansk, Contemporary Art Department
 2019 · “Art now”, pre auction exhibition, National Museum in Kraków
 2018 · “XIV Aniversario”, Galeria de Arte Montsequi, Madrid, Spain
 2018 · “Karpowicze”, exhibition of the Karpowicz family as a part of Capital of a Polish Language Festival, Szczebrzeszyn
 2018 · “Realism, Two Perspectives”, BWA Gallery, Bydgoszcz
 2017 · “Leszek Misiak and Students”, Centrum Gallery, Nowa Huta Cultural Centre, Academy of Fine Arts Gallery, Krakow
 2017 · “Configurations”, Krakow Artistic Meetings, Association of Polish Artists and Designers, Art Bunker, Krakow
 2017 · “Small Format”, exhibition of the Krakow District of the Association of Polish Artists and Designers, Raven Gallery, Krakow
 2016 · “Espacios, ciudades, arquitecturas, gente”, Galeria de Arte Montsequi, Madrid, Spain
 2016 · “8 women”, Regional Society for the Promotion of Fine Arts, Konduktorownia, Czestochowa
 2015 · Christmas exhibition of the Krakow branch of the association of Polish Artists and Designers, Arts Palace, Krakow
 2015 · “The Abstract, the Figure”, contemporary painting created in Kraków, MANK Gallery, Szentendre, Hungary
 2015 · Exhibition of paintings and sculptures of the Krakow Branch of the Association of Polish Artists and Designers, Centrum Gallery, Nowa Huta centre for culture, Krakow
 2015 · “Exercise”, Platan Gallery, Budapest
 2014 · “4 x Karpowicz”, Raven Gallery, Kraków
 2013 · “Zakynthos 2013”, Stalowa Gallery, Warsaw
 2012 · Katarzyna and Joanna Karpowicz, “Art saves life”, Galeria Fundacji Promocji Sztuki Współczesnej, Warsaw, Poland
 2011 · Yokohama Akarenga Soko – presenting young artists from Yokohama & Krakow – Yokohama, Japan
 2011 · “100 years of ZPAP Krakow” Art Palace – Cracow, Poland
 2007 · “Landschaft als suggestive Vision von Licht und Raum”, group exhibition, Steyr, Austria

Selected book illustrations
 Wacław Oszajca, Uwierz mu na słowo, Felietony, Wydawnictwo WAM, 2015.
 Kasia Skrzynkowska, Balony

Selected awards 
 2019 · Awarded the Grazella Foundation’s artistic scholarship
 2019 · Third place in ranking of young artists in Poland – Art Compas * 2019 Third place in Compass of Young Artists 
 2018 · Second place in ranking of young artists in Poland – Art Compas
 2017 · Second place in ranking of young artists in Poland – Art Compas
 2016 · Fourth place in ranking of young artists in Poland – Art Compas
 2015 · Eighth place in ranking of young artists in Poland – Art Compas
 2014 · Ninth place in ranking of young artists in Poland – Art Compas
 2012 · Thirteenth place in ranking of young artists in Poland – Art Compas
 2012 · Honorable Mention in the painting competition E. Eibisch – Warsaw
 2011 · Prize of the president of the Painters Club Association of Polish Artists – Krakow
 2008 · Honorable mention for the autobiographical comic contest Gutek Film
 2005 · Completion "I Wigierski School of Ethics" organized by the Adam Mickiewicz University in Poznan
 2005 · First prize in the National Painting Bienniale "Human Landscape" dedicated to Jozef Czapski
 2004 · First prize for painting in the national art competition "Contemporary Europe, People and Places" – Katowice

References

External links
 
 
 

1985 births
Living people
21st-century Polish painters
21st-century Polish women artists
Polish women painters
Artists from Kraków
Jan Matejko Academy of Fine Arts alumni